Ross MacLean (born 13 March 1997) is a Scottish footballer who plays as a midfielder for Dumbarton. MacLean has previously played for Greenock Morton, Motherwell, Falkirk and Queen's Park.

Career
On 10 January 2015, MacLean made his debut for Motherwell as a substitute in a 4–1 defeat against Dundee.

On 7 December 2016, MacLean signed a new two-and-a-half-year deal with Motherwell. He scored his first career goal on 9 August 2017, scoring the winner in extra-time as Motherwell won 3–2 away to Ross County in the Scottish League Cup.

MacLean was loaned to Greenock Morton in June 2018 for the 2018–19 season; scoring for the club on his league debut against Queen of the South.

MacLean signed for Falkirk in January 2019. He left Falkirk in January 2020 and signed for Queen's Park. After winning the 2020–21 Scottish League Two title with the Spiders, MacLean signed a two-year deal with Dumbarton in June 2021 scoring on his debut in a 2-1 defeat to Stenhousemuir. He finished the season as the club's top scorer, with nine goals, as the Sons were relegated to Scottish League Two.

Career statistics

References

External links
 Ross MacLean profile at Motherwell FC official website
 

1997 births
Association football midfielders
Greenock Morton F.C. players
Living people
Motherwell F.C. players
Scottish footballers
Scottish Professional Football League players
Footballers from Bellshill
Falkirk F.C. players
Queen's Park F.C. players